The All-time Bundesliga table is a ranking of all German football clubs based on their performance in the Bundesliga, the top division of German football. In this ranking 3 points are awarded for a win, 1 for a draw, and 0 for a loss, although the Bundesliga awarded 2 points for a win until the 1994–95 season.

In the 1983–84 season, Bayern Munich took the lead from 1. FC Köln, which had led the standings since the inception of the Bundesliga in 1963. The ranking includes the 56 teams which have played in the Bundesliga since its inception (in the 2019–20 season, Union Berlin joined the Bundesliga to become the league's 56th team). Hamburger SV was the last club to have participated in all seasons, but they were relegated after the 2017–18 season.

Clubs highlighted in blue and green play in the Bundesliga in the 2022–23 season, which marks the 60th season since inception. Clubs highlighted in yellow were members of the inaugural 1963–64 Bundesliga which do not currently play in the Bundesliga.

This list is current as of 5 August 2022, at the start of the 2022–23 season.

Table
Key

Years includes current season
Number of consecutive seasons in the Bundesliga, counting the current one
Number of championships
Best result at the end of a season.
In the 2003–04 season, 1. FC Kaiserslautern received a three-point penalty.
In the 1999–2000 season, Eintracht Frankfurt received a two-point penalty.
In the 1971–72 season, Arminia Bielefeld's record was expunged as a penalty.
In the 1993–94 season, Dynamo Dresden received a four-point penalty.

References

External links
Ewige Tabelle Official Bundesliga website – All-time table 

Dynamic lists
Bundesliga records and statistics
Germany